VL and variants may refer to:
Daisy V/L, the first production rifle for caseless ammunition
Holden VL Commodore, an automobile introduced by Holden in 1986
Air Via (IATA airline designator VL)
Valtion Lentokonetehtaat, the Finnish State aircraft manufacturer
Ventral lateral nucleus, a component of the thalamus in the central nervous system
Verbotene Liebe, ("Forbidden Love"), a German soap opera
VL, Canadian data integration company (formerly Virtual Logistics Inc.)
Visceral leishmaniasis, an infectious disease
Vlaanderen, Dutch for Flanders, one of the three regions of Belgium
Volume licensing, in which an organization pays once for many users in the organization to access copies of the same software product
Vulgar Latin, nonstandard sociolects of Latin from which the Romance languages developed
Vertical landing